Salil Desai is an Indian novelist who writes murder mysteries based in Pune, India. His debut novel, The Body in the Back Seat, which was published in May 2011, was acclaimed as "the best murder mystery by an Indian author so far" by The Tribune. An alumnus of FTII, and a former journalist, he has also produced films, held creative writing workshops and written a number of short stories.

His crime thriller ‘The Sane Psychopath’ was inspired by a real-life incident and  the author created a narrative about  how a soft-spoken and mild-mannered bus driver called Shankar Lande  goes on an hour-long mindless rampage in Pune, killing ten people, injuring 70 and almost wrecking a hundred other vehicles.

List of works

 (2011).
 (2012).
 (2012).
 (2015)

 Anthologies in which stories have appeared -
Stories at the Coffee Table (Caferati).
The Shrinking Woman and Other Stories (Unisun).
Chicken Soup for the Indian Teenage Soul (Westland).
Vanilla Desires (Unisun). volume 1
Chicken Soup for the Indian College Soul (Westland).
The Killer App and Other Stories (Penguin).

References

Indian male novelists
Novelists from Maharashtra
Journalists from Maharashtra
Year of birth missing (living people)
Living people